The psychology of reasoning (also known as the cognitive science of reasoning) is the study of how people reason, often broadly defined as the process of drawing conclusions to inform how people solve problems and make decisions. It overlaps with psychology, philosophy, linguistics, cognitive science, artificial intelligence, logic, and probability theory.

Psychological experiments on how humans and other animals reason have been carried out for over 100 years. An enduring question is whether or not people have the capacity to be rational. Current research in this area addresses various questions about reasoning, rationality, judgments, intelligence, relationships between emotion and reasoning, and development.

Everyday reasoning
One of the most obvious areas in which people employ reasoning is with sentences in everyday language. Most experimentation on deduction has been carried out on hypothetical thought, in particular, examining how people reason about conditionals, e.g., If A then B. Participants in experiments make the modus ponens inference, given the indicative conditional If A then B, and given the premise A, they conclude B. However, given the indicative conditional and the minor premise for the modus tollens inference, not-B, about half of the participants in experiments conclude not-A and the remainder concludes that nothing follows.

The ease with which people make conditional inferences is affected by context, as demonstrated in the well-known selection task developed by Peter Wason. Participants are better able to test a conditional in an ecologically relevant context, e.g., if the envelope is sealed then it must have a 50 cent stamp on it compared to one that contains symbolic content, e.g., if the letter is a vowel then the number is even. Background knowledge can also lead to the suppression of even the simple modus ponens inference  Participants given the conditional if Lisa has an essay to write then she studies late in the library and the premise Lisa has an essay to write  make the modus ponens inference 'she studies late in the library', but the inference is suppressed when they are also given a second conditional if the library stays open then she studies late in the library. Interpretations of the suppression effect are controversial

Other investigations of propositional inference examine how people think about disjunctive alternatives, e.g., A or else B, and how they reason about negation, e.g., It is not the case that A and B. Many experiments have been carried out to examine how people make relational inferences, including comparisons, e.g., A is better than B. Such investigations also concern spatial inferences, e.g. A is in front of B and temporal inferences, e.g. A occurs before B. Other common tasks include categorical syllogisms, used to examine how people reason about quantifiers such as All or Some, e.g., Some of the A are not B.

Theories of reasoning 
There are several alternative theories of the cognitive processes that human reasoning is based on. One view is that people rely on a mental logic consisting of formal (abstract or syntactic) inference rules similar to those developed by logicians in the propositional calculus. Another view is that people rely on domain-specific or content-sensitive rules of inference. A third view is that people rely on mental models, that is, mental representations that correspond to imagined possibilities. A fourth view is that people compute probabilities.

One controversial theoretical issue is the identification of an appropriate competence model, or a standard against which to compare human reasoning. Initially classical logic was chosen as a competence model. Subsequently, some researchers opted for non-monotonic logic and Bayesian probability. Research on mental models and reasoning has led to the suggestion that people are rational in principle but err in practice. Connectionist approaches towards reasoning have also been proposed.

Development of reasoning
It is an active question in psychology how, why, and when the ability to reason develops from infancy to adulthood. Jean Piaget's theory of cognitive development posited general mechanisms and stages in the development of reasoning from infancy to adulthood. According to the neo-Piagetian theories of cognitive development, changes in reasoning with development come from increasing working memory capacity, increasing speed of processing, and enhanced executive functions and control. Increasing self-awareness is also an important factor.

In their book The Enigma of Reason, the cognitive scientists Hugo Mercier and Dan Sperber put forward an "argumentative" theory of reasoning, claiming that humans evolved to reason primarily to justify our beliefs and actions and to convince others in a social environment. Key evidence for their theory includes the errors in reasoning that solitary individuals are prone to when their arguments are not criticized, such as logical fallacies, and how groups become much better at performing cognitive reasoning tasks when they communicate with one another and can evaluate each other's arguments. Sperber and Mercier offer one attempt to resolve the apparent paradox that the confirmation bias is so strong despite the function of reasoning naively appearing to be to come to veridical conclusions about the world.

Different sorts of reasoning
Philip Johnson-Laird trying to taxonomize thought, distinguished between goal-directed thinking and thinking without goal, noting that association was involved in unrelated reading. He argues that goal directed reasoning can be classified based on the problem space involved in a solution, citing Allen Newell and Herbert A. Simon.

Inductive reasoning makes broad generalizations from specific cases or observations. In this process of reasoning, general assertions are made based on past specific pieces of evidence. This kind of reasoning allows the conclusion to be false even if the original statement is true. For example, if one observes a college athlete, one makes predictions and assumptions about other college athletes based on that one observation. Scientists use inductive reasoning to create theories and hypotheses. Philip Johnson-Laird distinguished inductive from deductive reasoning, in that the former creates semantic information while the later does not .

In opposition, deductive reasoning is a basic form of valid reasoning. In this reasoning process a person starts with a known claim or a general belief and from there asks what follows from these foundations or how will these premises influence other beliefs. In other words, deduction starts with a hypothesis and examines the possibilities to reach a conclusion. Deduction helps people understand why their predictions are wrong and indicates that their prior knowledge or beliefs are off track. An example of deduction can be seen in the scientific method when testing hypotheses and theories. Although the conclusion usually corresponds and therefore proves the hypothesis, there are some cases where the conclusion is logical, but the generalization is not. For example, the argument, "All young girls wear skirts; Julie is a young girl; therefore, Julie wears skirts" is valid logically, but is not sound because the first premise isn't true.

The syllogism is a form of deductive reasoning in which two statements reach a logical conclusion. With this reasoning, one statement could be "Every A is B" and another could be "This C is A". Those two statements could then lead to the conclusion that "This C is B". These types of syllogisms are used to test deductive reasoning to ensure there is a valid hypothesis. A Syllogistic Reasoning Task was created from a study performed by Morsanyi, Kinga, Handley, and Simon that examined the intuitive contributions to reasoning. They used this test to assess why "syllogistic reasoning performance is based on an interplay between a conscious and effortful evaluation of logicality and an intuitive appreciation of the believability of the conclusions".

Another form of reasoning is called abductive reasoning. This type is based on creating and testing hypotheses using the best information available. Abductive reasoning produces the kind of daily decision-making that works best with the information present, which often is incomplete. This could involve making educated guesses from observed unexplainable phenomena. This type of reasoning can be seen in the world when doctors make decisions about diagnoses from a set of results or when jurors use the relevant evidence to make decisions about a case.

Judgment and reasoning
Judgment and reasoning involve thinking through the options, making a judgment or conclusion and finally making a decision. Making judgments involves heuristics, or efficient strategies that usually lead one to the right answers. The most common heuristics used are attribute substitution, the availability heuristic, the representativeness heuristic and the anchoring heuristic – these all aid in quick reasoning and work in most situations. Heuristics allow for errors, a price paid to gain efficiency.
 
Other errors in judgment, therefore affecting reasoning, include errors in judgment about covariation – a relationship between two variables such that the presence and magnitude of one can predict the presence and magnitude of the other. One cause of covariation is confirmation bias, or the tendency to be more responsive to evidence that confirms one's own beliefs. But assessing covariation can be pulled off track by neglecting base-rate information – how frequently something occurs in general. However people often ignore base rates and tend to use other information presented.
 
There are more sophisticated judgment strategies that result in fewer errors. People often reason based on availability but sometimes they look for other, more accurate, information to make judgments. This suggests there are two ways of thinking, known as the Dual-Process Model. The first, System I, is fast, automatic and uses heuristics – more of intuition. The second, System II, is slower, effortful and more likely to be correct – more reasoning.

Pragmatics and reasoning
The inferences people draw are related to factors such as linguistic pragmatics and emotion.

Decision making is often influenced by the emotion of regret and by the presence of risk. When people are presented with options, they tend to select the one that they think they will regret the least. In decisions that involve a large amount of risk, people tend to ask themselves how much dread they would experience were a worst-case scenario to occur, e.g. a nuclear accident, and then use that dread as an indicator of the level of risk.

Antonio Damasio suggests that somatic markers, certain memories that can cause a strong bodily reaction, act as a way to guide decision making as well. For example, when a person is remembering a scary movie and once again becomes tense, their palms might begin to sweat. Damasio argues that when making a decision people rely on their "gut feelings" to assess various options, and this makes them decide to go with a decision that is more positive and stay away from those that are negative. He also argues that the orbitofrontal cortex – located at the base of the frontal lobe, just above the eyes – is crucial in the use of somatic markers, because it is the part in the brain that allows people to interpret emotion.

When emotion shapes decisions, the influence is usually based on predictions of the future. When people ask themselves how they would react, they are making inferences about the future. Researchers suggest affective forecasting, the ability to predict one's own emotions, is poor because people tend to overestimate how much they will regret their errors.

Neuroscience of reasoning
Studying reasoning neuroscientifically involves determining the neural correlates of reasoning, often investigated using event-related potentials and functional magnetic resonance imaging.

See also
 Bounded rationality
 Cognitive psychology
 Ecological rationality
 Emotional self-regulation
 Great Rationality Debate
 Heuristics in judgment and decision-making
 Naturalistic decision-making

Notes

Artificial intelligence
Cognition
Cognitive linguistics
Cognitive psychology
Logic
Psycholinguistics
Reasoning